Jeong Yol (born October 19, 1978) is a South Korean LGBT rights activist. Since the foundation of Solidarity for LGBT Human Rights of Korea in 1997, he has been an early member of SLRK. From 1998 to 2012, he had been a representative of SLRK. His real name is Jeong Min-suk (정민석).

During college, he acknowledged that he was gay. Later, while serving his mandatory military service, he came out as a homosexual. Then, his commanding officer took him to a mental hospital. After his discharge, he worked as a pastry chef for six years.

In 1997, he joined SLRK. In 2000, he spent more time with SLRK, From 2002 to 2012, he has been a representative of SLRK. In February 2003, the word "homosexual" was deemed a harmful word for youth by South Korean government. So, he struggled against the government with Kwak Yi-kyong, Chang Pyong-kwon and others. In April 2004, banning the word "homosexual" for youth was eliminated in South Korea.

In 2003, he led a movement for the Elimination of Discrimination against LGBT. In 2004, he joined anti-war and peace movements. Since 2006, he has fought for people living with HIV's rights.

Books 
 Bravo Gay life [브라보 게이 라이프]. Seoul: Nareum Books [나름 북스], 2011. .

See also 
 LGBT rights in South Korea

References

External links 
 Yol's Twitter 
 HIV.AIDS 인권연대 나누리  
 정민석 통합진보당 성소수자위원회 위원장 인터뷰 
 청소년 동성애자들이 신음하고 있다 
 四口一言 - '종로의 기적' 이혁상 감독,소준문,장병권,정욜의 미녀들의 수다 아시아경제 2011.04.27 
 나는 나로서 자유롭다 씨네21 

1978 births
South Korean LGBT rights activists
South Korean human rights activists
South Korean humanitarians
People from Seoul
South Korean columnists
South Korean pacifists
Former Roman Catholics
Living people
South Korean gay writers